Ad Astra per Aspera is the second studio album by the American Christian rock band Abandon Kansas.  It is the first album released by Gotee Records.

The track "Liar" is a re-release of "Minutes" which featured on their first album. The track "Heaven Come My Way" was featured on an episode of The CW game show Oh Sit!.

Track listing

References

External links 
 Official site
 Jesus Freak Hideout

2011 albums
Abandon Kansas albums
Gotee Records albums